The Taigu West railway station  is a railway station of Datong–Xi'an Passenger Railway that is located in Taigu County, Shanxi, China. It started operation on July 1, 2014, together with the Railway.

See also
Taigu railway station
Taigu East railway station

Railway stations in China opened in 2014
Railway stations in Shanxi